Stephen C. Miner (born June 18, 1951) is an American director of film and television, film producer, and a member of the Motion Picture Academy of Arts and Sciences. He is notable for his work in the horror genre, including Friday the 13th Part 2, Friday the 13th Part III, House, Warlock, Halloween H20: 20 Years Later, Lake Placid, and Day of the Dead. He has also directed numerous comedy and drama films, as well as episodes of notable television series including The Wonder Years, Dawson's Creek, and Smallville.

Life and career
Miner was born in Chicago, Illinois.

He began work in the film industry as a recurring collaborator of producer-director Sean S. Cunningham, filling in for various behind the scenes roles on films such as The Last House on the Left and Friday the 13th. His directorial debut was the latter film's first sequel, and he directed the third entry less than a year later. In 1983, Miner acquired the rights from Toho to develop an American Godzilla film titled Godzilla: King of the Monsters in 3D, with Miner attached as the director. Miner hired Fred Dekker to write the script and William Stout for storyboards and concept art. Miner generated some interest in Hollywood but was unable to secure financing and let the rights revert to Toho.

Miner went on to direct other horror films such as Warlock, Halloween H20: 20 Years Later, and Lake Placid. Miner first crossed over into the comedy genre with his 1985 cult horror-comedy House, and has since gone on to direct other films in the genre including Soul Man and Big Bully.
Miner is the only director to have crossed over and directed more than one of the horror "Big 3" (Halloween/Michael Myers, Friday the 13th/Jason Voorhees and Nightmare on Elm Street/Freddy Krueger).

Miner has since become a notable television director on shows like Smallville, Psych, Felicity, Dawson's Creek (including the pilot and four of the other episodes of the first season), and Diagnosis: Murder. His work on The Wonder Years earned him a Primetime Emmy nomination for Outstanding Comedy Series and a DGA Award for Outstanding Directing in a Comedy Series.

Filmography

Films 
Director
Friday the 13th Part 2 (1981) (Also producer)
Friday the 13th Part III (1982)
House (1985)
Soul Man (1986)
Warlock (1989) (Also producer)
Wild Hearts Can't Be Broken (1991)
Forever Young (1992)
My Father the Hero (1994)
Big Bully (1996)
Halloween H20: 20 Years Later (1998)
Lake Placid (1999)
Texas Rangers (2001)
Day of the Dead (2008) 
Private Valentine: Blonde & Dangerous (2008)

Other credits

Television 
TV movies

TV series

References

Bibliography

External links

1951 births
American male film actors
American television directors
Film directors from Illinois
Horror film directors
Living people
People from Westport, Connecticut
Artists from Chicago
20th-century American male actors
Directors Guild of America Award winners
Male actors from Chicago
Film directors from Connecticut